Passagen may refer to

 Passagen (web portal)
 Passagen Verlag, a German publisher